Poogy in a Pita (Hebrew: פוגי בפיתה, Poogy BePita) is the second album by the Israeli rock band Kaveret, released in 1974.

Songs
About a year after forming the band and the release of the first album, Poogy Tales, the band released their second album, which succeeded less than their first album, but included many hits. Most of the albums' songs are new recordings of older songs of Danny Sanderson, mostly from the rock opera that preceded Kaveret. In this album, like their first, the songs were characterized by Nonsense and word play.

The greatest hit from the album, is "Natati La Khayay" (I Gave Her My Life) that was the Israeli entry in the Eurovision Song Contest 1974, and placed seventh in the competition final. The song "Okhel TaTzipornaim" (Eating the Fingernails) was originally a part of the rock opera "HaSipur Hamakhrid 'Al HaYeled MiBrazil" (The Horrific Story About the Boy from Brazil) (1971) and "Shir HaMekhiron" (The Price List Song) was originally a part of the "Poogy Opera" (1972). The song "Moshe Ken, Moshe Lo" (Moshe Yes, Moshe No) was originally called "Mushroom Revolution", and was written by Sanderson when he was in The Nahal Band.

The album also included a cover of the song "Hora He'akhzut" (Settlement Hora) that was performed by The Nahal Band at the evening of the Nahal Band songs. The album also included nonsense that was performed at the band's live shows "Sukar BaTe" (Sugar in the Tea) or "Shir Mekha'a (Antibiotiqa)" (Protest song (Antibiotics)) that was written by Yoni Rechter, a short parody about Bob Dylan, and the first song which Rechter sang in solo.

Some of the songs introduced new musical styles: The instrumental "HaTmanun Ha'Itter" (The Left-handed Octopus) included influences of oriental music. It was performed by "The Schnitzels", the beat band of Alon Olearthick and Sanderson, and played in the two versions of the  Jerusalem Symphony Orchestra (Conductor: Zuzu Musa). Also the song "LeAmor 'E'Lavi" included Oriental influences. The song was written together with the qanun player, Abraham Slaman. The closing song "HaBalada Al Ari VeDerchi" (The Ballad of Ari and Derchi), is a progressive rock song, that wasn't a success in the band's live shows. In the song, Gidi Gov plays on a recorder, and Rechter plays mellotron, synthesizer and moog, which were unusual instruments for the band at the time.

In 1990, the album was re-released on a CD, along with four bonus tracks that weren't included in the original release. Most of the bonus tracks are improvisations that were played during the band's rehearsals.

Commercial performance
The album made Kaveret the Band of the year in Kol Yisrael (for the second time), and the band's live shows continued to be a success. "Natati La Khayay" won the Song of the Year in 1974, and also reached the Israeli Annual Hebrew Song Chart. The songs "HaBalada Al Ari VeDerchi" came as No. 9 and "Shir HaMekhiron" came as No. 25.

Track listing
Natati La Khayay - I Gave Her My Life (נתתי לה חיי) - 2:58
Moshe Ken, Moshe Lo - Moshe Yes, Moshe No (משה כן, משה לא) - 3:14
Okhel TaTzipornaim - Eating the Fingernails (אוכל ת'ציפורניים) - 2:32
L'amour Et La Vie (לאמור א'לאבי) - 4:05
Sukar BaTe - Sugar in the Tea (סוכר בתה) - 2:49
Hora He'akhzut - Hora Holding (הורה היאחזות) - 3:32
HaTmanun HaItter - The Left-handed Octopus (התמנון האיטר) - 3:14
Shir HaMekhiron - The Price List Song (שיר המחירון) - 3:20
Shir Mekha'a (Antibiotiqa) - Protest Song (Antibiotics) (שיר מחאה (אנטיביוטיקה) - 0:49)
HaBalada Al Ari VeDerchi - The Ballad of Ari and Derchi (הבלדה על ארי ודרצ'י) - 6:32
Bonus tracks in the CD edition
"Im Haya Li Lev Zahav" - If I Had a Golden Heart (אם היה לי לב זהב) - 2:21
"Hora" (הורה) - 2:54
"Tnu Likhiot" - Let Us Live (תנו לחיות) - 1:56
"Hafsaqat Khashmal" - Power Outage (הפסקת חשמל) - 2:14

Personnel
Danny Sanderson - vocals, guitars, music, lyrics
Gidi Gov - lead vocals, tambourine, recorder on track 10
Efraim Shamir - lead vocals, guitars, harmonica
Alon Oleartchik - vocals, bass guitar, music, lyrics
Yitzhak "Churchill" Klepter - vocals, electric guitar
Yoni Rechter - vocals, piano, Fender Rhodes, Moog synthesizer, Oberheim synthesizer, Mellotron
Meir "Poogy" Fenigstein - drums, percussion, spoken word and vocals as "Poogy"

References

1974 albums
Kaveret albums